Kaun Pravin Tambe?  is a 2022 Indian Hindi-language biographical sports drama film directed by Jayprad Desai. It is based on the life of Indian cricketer Pravin Tambe. The film stars Shreyas Talpade and premiered on Disney+ Hotstar on 1 April 2022.

This was the last film to be released under the Fox Star Studios name before being rebranded to Star Studios on 27 May 2022.

Cast 

 Shreyas Talpade as Pravin Tambe
 Ashish Vidyarthi as Vidya Paradkar, Coach of Orient Shipping
 Parambrata Chatterjee as Rajat Sanyal, a sports journalist
 Anjali Patil as Vaishali Tambe, Pravin's wife
 Shekar Betkar as Bandu
 Aditi Patil as Deepa Tambe
 Nyshita Bajaj as Pari Tambe
 Chayya Kadam as Jyothi Tambe, Pravin's mother
 Arun Nalawade as Vijay Tambe, Pravin's father
 Nitin Rao as Abey Kuruvilla
 Chirag Trivedi as Rahul Dravid
 Prasad Oak as Vijay Patil
 Ajinkya Date as Jatin
 Gaurav Kamble as Shyam
 Asif Ali as Journalist Kishore
 Vedant Mishra as Vikas
 Ankur Dabas as Ajay Kadam
 Jagdish Chavan as Jagdish

Soundtrack 
Music composed by Anurag Saikia.

Release 
The film premiered on Disney+ Hotstar on 1 April 2022, in Hindi also dubbed in Tamil as Yaar Pravin Tambe? and Telugu as Pravin Tambe Evaru?.

Reception 
Devesh Sharma of Filmfare rated the film 4 out of 5 stars and wrote "Director Jayprad Desai has given us a pulsating human drama in the guise of a sports biopic". Pallabi Dey Purkayastha of The Times of India rated the film 3.5 out of 5 stars and wrote "
Unless you are venturing into the sports biopic genre with 'Kaun Pravin Tambe?'—let's be honest here—it will not leave you stupefied." Saibal Chatterjee of NDTV rated the film 3 out of 5 stars and wrote "It pieces together a fascinating life story that is much more about dour tenacity than about flashy achievements and staggering statistics". Anna M. M. Vetticad of Firstpost rated the film 3 out of 5 stars and wrote "Few Indian actors are as qualified to take on Pravin Tambe's biopic as the Hindi-Marathi star Shreyas Talpade who first attracted the national spotlight playing a deaf-mute cricketer in Nagesh Kukunoor's 2005 film Iqbal. Rohan Naahar of Indian Express rated the film 2 out of 5 stars and wrote "Shreyas Talpade delivers an earnest performance in Hotstar's unmemorable cricket biopic, which feels like reading a dozen editions of the Wisden almanac back-to-back".

References

External links 
 

Disney+ Hotstar original films
2022 films
2020s Hindi-language films
Fox Star Studios films
Films about cricket in India
Indian biographical films
Sports films based on actual events
Biographical films about sportspeople
Cultural depictions of cricketers
Cultural depictions of Indian men